The enzyme monoterpenyl-diphosphatase (EC 3.1.7.3) catalyzes the reaction 

a monoterpenyl diphosphate + H2O  a monoterpenol + diphosphate

This enzyme belongs to the family of hydrolases, specifically those acting on diphosphoric monoester bonds.  The systematic name is monoterpenyl-diphosphate diphosphohydrolase. Other names in common use include bornyl pyrophosphate hydrolase and monoterpenyl-pyrophosphatase.

References

EC 3.1.7
Enzymes of unknown structure